In mathematics, the Coxeter–Todd lattice K12, discovered by , is a 12-dimensional even integral lattice of discriminant 36  with no norm-2 vectors. It is the sublattice of the Leech lattice fixed by a certain automorphism of order 3, and is analogous to the Barnes–Wall lattice.  The automorphism group of the Coxeter–Todd lattice has order 210·37·5·7=78382080, and there are 756 vectors in this lattice of norm 4 (the shortest nonzero vectors in this lattice).

Properties
The Coxeter–Todd lattice can be made into a 6-dimensional lattice self dual over the Eisenstein integers. The automorphism group of this complex lattice has index 2 in the full automorphism group of the Coxeter–Todd lattice and is a complex reflection group (number 34 on the list) with structure 6.PSU4(F3).2, called the Mitchell group.

Construction 
Based on Nebe web page we can define K12 using following 6 vectors in 6-dimensional complex coordinates. ω is complex number of order 3 i.e. ω3=1. 

(1,0,0,0,0,0), (0,1,0,0,0,0), (0,0,1,0,0,0),

½(1,ω,ω,1,0,0),  ½(ω,1,ω,0,1,0), ½(ω,ω,1,0,0,1),

By adding vectors having scalar product -½ and multiplying by ω we can obtain all lattice vectors. We have 15 combinations of two zeros times 16 possible signs gives 240 vectors; plus 6 unit vectors times 2 for signs gives 240+12=252 vectors. Multiply it by 3 using multiplication by ω we obtain 756 unit vectors in K12 lattice.

Further reading

References

External links
 Coxeter–Todd lattice in Sloane's lattice catalogue

Quadratic forms